Hyphaene compressa, also known as the East African doum palm, is a palm tree in the genus Hyphaene. It is a tree known for its unique branching, unlike most palms which are not branched. This palm tree is very abundant in Eastern Africa and is a vital socioeconomic resource to the rural pastoralist and agro-pastoralists there.

Distribution 
There is a high concentration of Hyphaene compressa along the coasts of Northern East Africa, particularly Kenya and Tanzania. Additional countries with a high distribution of Hyphaene compressa include Somalia, Madagascar and Ethiopia. The palm also occurs to a lesser extent towards the Arabian Peninsula and India. The Doum Palm is densely concentrated around lakes and river ecosystems of the Turkana Valley and surrounding National Parks in Kenya.

The East African doum palm has expanded its range into the United States due to its horticultural interest.

Habitat and ecology 
Hyphaene compressa is found in hot and dry climates.  The East African Doum Palm flourishes in tropical and subtropical regions with temperatures ranging between 36-38 degrees Celsius. The trees are adapted to semi-arid to arid climates with a low annual rainfall of 150 to 600 mm. The trees obtain water by having a high water table in which the trees taproots can access. Hyphaene compressa thrives in direct light in open grasslands and along edges of lakes, swamps, rivers and oceans.
The soils of the doum palm are salty, calcareous and alkaline (pH 9) and of general poor quality.
The Hyphaene compressa is a woody dioecious tree that is slow growing and long living. Some trees can grow to be 100 years old but because of the high human interference this number is reduced to around 30 years.

Description 
Hyphaene compressa is a robust tree that stands erect, growing to about 10–20 meters (35–70 ft) in height. The tree can be said to be fairly fire resistant and drought resistant. The East African Doum Palm is considered difficult to destroy because it grows bulbs and deep taproots underground that will allow the tree to regrow if it is damaged above ground. Individuals of this species are dichotomously branched and the stems may branch about five times by full maturity. Little is known about the dichotomous venation, the only other genera of palms to naturally exhibit this trait are the  Dypsis, Korthalsia and Laccosperma. The leaves are medium to large sized palmate or fan shaped and emerge at the top of the tree in small crowns.  The spiny leaf stalks and the fruit develop at the base of these crowns.

Fruit and reproduction 
Fruits of Hyphaene compressa are produced after 30 years of maturation and can be harvested regularly every 6 months when the tree is between 40 and 50 years old. The fruit is considered a drupe    and grows almost all year round, taking three to ten months to germinate. The fruits of Hyphaene compressa are eaten by elephants, baboons, and monkeys (endangered Tane River Crested Manbey). Elephants favour eating the Doum palm fruit and have become the major mechanism for seed dispersal in Hyphaene compressa.  The fruits are edible by humans and are highly packed with energy. When ripe the fruit appears orange-brown and tastes sweet. The doum palm can produce up to thousands of fruit per tree, each fruit growing 6–12 cm long and 4–9 cm wide.

Usage of tree 
Almost all of the East African doum palm can be utilised, the most highly used part of the tree being its leaves.  Hyphaene compressa has a variety of different uses and is a vital economic resource in rural African communities.

Leaves 
The age the palm leaves are harvested dictate what goods are produced.
The stalks of immature palm leaves are split into long strips to make a variety of products such as baskets, mats, chairs, brooms and hats. The leaves can also be beaten and separated into fibers to make hammocks. Mature green leaves are dried and used to cover the roofs of huts, make fire and to also create weaved goods. The uses for these leaves as shelter have expanded to include tourist sites and refugee camps and also with the increase in more permanent settlements in African communities.

Fruits 
The people of Eastern Africa depend on the fruit from the doum palm Hyphaene compressa in different ways. It is popular as a food source, more so during times of food shortage, and is commonly bought and sold in local markets  The mesocarp or pulp of the young fruit can be made into a non-alcoholic juice drink which children enjoy. The seed coat within the mesocarp is hard to crack but the nut inside can be eaten or crushed into a powder to flavor other food items.

Stems 
By incising the stems of older trees, its sap can be made into an alcoholic wine of about 3.6 volume %. This practice is often performed incorrectly by cutting into the stem too deeply which kills the tree. Although, if the sap is extracted correctly, the tree is viable for an additional two to three years. The wines 24hour expiration time and lack of investment into preservation has kept it lost from being economically important. The trunks before the first branching can be made into very sturdy, termite proof building material that includes poles, fences and latrines. Although the fellow Coconut Palm Cocos in the same family of Palms has been very popular as an exported building good, the East African Doum Palm is claimed to be sturdier because of its higher density timber.

Additional names 
The East African doum palm has many different names in native African languages. 
Boni (Medi); Chonyi (Mkoma); Digo (Mkoma lume); Gabra (Meetti); Giriama (Mlala); Kamba (Mukoma); Kambe (Mkoma); Mbeere (Irara); Orma (Kone); Pokomo (Mkoma); Pokot (Tangayiween); Rendile (Baar); Samburu (Iparwa); Sanya (Auwaki); Somali (Baar); Swahili (Mkoma, Mlala); Taveta (Irara); Tharaka (Muruguyu); Turkana (Eeng'ol)

Socioeconomic importance 
The presence of the doum palm Hyphaene compressa has increased living standards in rural communities in which the fruit, leaves and stems are monetarily valuable. Weaved products are sold and traded at local and international markets  where extreme specificity of skill and craftsmanship can be seen. Subsequently the marketing and distribution of thatched products creates a niche that requires retailers, wholesales and of course local manufacturers that understand the changing local market. For example in Turkana, a women’s co-operative society has emerged to handle the sales of crafts. Although the East African doum palm has created a source of income for local peoples it is important to note that its economy is not stable or uniform throughout the region. Availability to Hyphaene compressa, ability to effectively utilize its product and skills of the regional people are all limiting factors.

Conservation 
Due to the high importance of the Hyphaene compressa poaching of its leaves in protected National Forests has become an issue. There has been evidence since the 1990s of overexploitation of the trees resources. Improper sap collection practices kill Palm trees and lack of knowledge on how to perform extraction is limiting the Palms longevity. Hyphaene compressa is in the process of being domesticated in some regions in Africa. Conservation laws to protect the tree from being overexploited have also been locally established as to ensure there is a lasting abundance of the East African Doum Palm.

References 

compressa
Trees of Africa
Dioecious plants